A. Sankara Reddy is a former principal of Sri Venkateswara College. He was awarded the prestigious Padma Shri award in 2009 for his contributions in the field of literature and education.

References

Year of birth missing (living people)
Living people
Recipients of the Padma Shri in literature & education